John Arnold (died c. 1410), of Blaxhall and Ipswich, Suffolk, was an English Member of Parliament.

He married, at some point before 1387, a woman named Christine. She was probably a daughter of Thomas Terry, also of Ipswich.

He was a Member (MP) of the Parliament of England for Ipswich in September 1388, 1394, January 1397 and 1399; he was also coroner and bailiff of the town and an alnager in Suffolk.

References

14th-century births
1410 deaths
English MPs September 1388
English MPs 1394
English MPs January 1397
English MPs 1399
English coroners
Bailiffs
Alnagers
Members of the Parliament of England (pre-1707) for Ipswich